Horse Brass Pub is a British-style pub in Portland, Oregon's Sunnyside neighborhood, in the United States. It was established in 1976.

References

External links

 
 

1976 establishments in Oregon
Restaurants established in 1976
Restaurants in Portland, Oregon